Miss Universe 1991, the 40th anniversary of the Miss Universe pageant, was held on May 17, 1991 at the Aladdin Theatre for the Performing Arts in Las Vegas, Nevada, United States. Lupita Jones of Mexico crowned by Mona Grudt of Norway. Seventy-three contestants competed in the 1991 Miss Universe pageant.

Results

Placements

Final Competition

Special Awards

Order of Announcements

Top 10

Top 6

Top 3

Contestants

  - Verónica Honnorat
  - Farrah Fiona Saunders
  - Katia Alens
  - Josephine Gault
  - Andrea Sullivan
  - María Selva Landívar
  - Patricia Franco de Godói
  - Anne Lennard
  - Christy Drumeva
  - Leslie McLaren
  - Bethea Michelle Christian
  - Cecilia del Rosario Alfaro
  - Maribel Gutiérrez Tinoco
  - Raema Chitty
  - Viviana Múñoz
  - Jacqueline Krijger
  - Renata Gorecka
  - Melissa Vargas
  - Diana Neira
  - Rebecca Dávila
  - Tanja Vienonen
  - Mareva Georges
  - Katrin Richter
  - Dela Tamakole
  - Marina Popou
  - Jevon Pellacani
  - Lorena Palacios
  - Anita Yuen
  - Dis Sigurgeirsdóttir
  - Christabelle Howie
  - Siobhan McClafferty
  - Miri Goldfarb
  - Maria Biscotti
  - Kimberley Mais
  - Atsuko Yamamoto
  - Fida Chehayeb
  - Annette Feydt
  - Elaine Chew
  - Michelle Zarb
  - Dhandevy Jeetun
  - Lupita Jones
  - Ronel Liebenberg
  - Pauline Huizinga
  - Ana Sofía Pereira
  - Tonia Okogbenin
  - Sharon Rosario
  - Lene Maria Pedersen
  - Liz De León
  - Vivian Benítez
  - Eliana Martínez
  - Maria Lourdes Gonzalez
  - Joanna Michalska
  - Lissette Bouret
  - Lin Shu-Chuan
  - Daniella Nane
  - Samantha Robertson
  - Eileen Yeow
  - Seo Jung-min
  - Julia Lemigova
  - Esther Arroyo
  - Diloka Seneviratne
  - Simone Vos
  - Susanna Gustafsson
  - Jiraprapa Sawettanan
  - Josie Anne Richards
  - Pinar Ozdemir
  - Kathy Hawkins
  - Adriana Comas
  - Helen Upton
  - Kelli McCarty
  - Monique Lindesay
  - Jackeline Rodríguez
  - Natasha Pavlovich

Order of Introduction
The following table is the order of introduction in the Parade of Nations segment in the regional groups, randomly-ordered.

Notes

Debuts

Returns
Last competed in 1952:
  The 3 constituent countries had their franchises unified, along with those territories that did not have their own franchises, as between 1955 and 1990, each constituent country on the United Kingdom (England, Scotland and Wales) sent their separated candidate to the pageant. Since 1994, candidates from Northern Ireland could choose to competing on Miss Ireland or on Miss United Kingdom.

Last competed in 1978:
 

Last competed in 1984:
  competed for the first time as an independent country after gaining independence from South Africa in February 1990.

Last competed in 1985:
 

Last competed in 1986:
 

Last competed in 1987:
 

Last competed in 1988:
 

Last competed in 1989:

Designations
  - Jackeline Rodríguez

Replacements
  - Maria Lourdes Gonzalez replaced Anjanette Abayari, who was not a Philippine citizen.
  - Sharon Luengo - The Director of Miss Venezuela pageant, Osmel Souza wanted to send her to Miss Universe due to the delay of the Miss Venezuela 1991 contest, but the Miss Universe Organization rejected her as a contestant due to her 2nd runner-up position at Miss World 1990, and they decided to select the Venezuelan delegate for Miss Universe 1991 under a special commission.
  – The winner of Miss USSR 1990, Maria Kezha, was underage after February 1.

Withdrawals
  – the Miss Aruba 1991 pageant was delayed and their 1991 winner, Jerusha Rasmijn, was sent to Miss Universe 1992.
  - due to lack of sponsorship and funding
  - Christine Heiss - unknown reason to compete
  - Sharon Givskav - due to lack of sponsorship and funding. She went to Miss World 1991 instead.
  - no contest.
  - Competed as United Kingdom or Great Britain since then.
  - Sarah Yeats (lost their license with the Miss Universe Inc.)
  - Bibiane Holm (lost their license with the Miss Universe Inc.) and went to Miss World 1991 instead
  - Claudia Mercedes Caballero (She fell ill and withdrew due to the fact that she suffered from chronic fatigue and had to rest by medical prescription.)
  - Carla Lopes Da Costa Caldeira - unknown reason to compete
  - Competed as United Kingdom or Great Britain since then.
  - Priscilla Leimgruber (She fell ill and withdrew at the last minute.)
  - Competed as United Kingdom or Great Britain since then.

Did not compete
  - Aisha Wawira Lieberg - due to lack of sponsorship and funding. She went to Miss Universe 1992 instead. 
  - Adele Valerie Kenny (because she was underage before February 1)

Name changes
  Holland began competing as Netherlands.
  Great Britain began competing as United Kingdom for the first time

General references

References

External links

 

1991
1991 in the United States
1991 beauty pageants
Beauty pageants in the United States
1991 in Nevada
Zappos Theater
Events in Las Vegas
May 1991 events in the United States